The Love of Captain Brando is a 1974 Spanish drama film written and directed by Jaime de Armiñán, starring Ana Belén, Fernando Fernán Gómez and Jaime Gamboa. It was shot in Pedraza, a medieval village in the province of Segovia, renamed  Trescabañas in the film. The plot follows the relationship of Aurora, a young school teacher, with two men of opposite generations who fall in love with her: Fernando, a middle age republican exile, and Juan, a thirteen-year-old boy who enjoys playing acting in Westerns, and his imitation of Marlon Brando gives the film its title. The Love of Captain Brando was entered into the 24th Berlin International Film Festival. The film was a critical and commercial success.

Cast
 Ana Belén as Aurora
 Fernando Fernán Gómez as Fernando
 Jaime Gamboa as Juan
 Antonio Ferrandis as The major
 Amparo Soler Leal as Amparo, Juan mother
 Verónica Llimera as Kety, Juan aunt
 Chus Lampreave as Doña Concha, the major wife
 Julieta Serrano as Maria Rosa
 Fernando Marín as Panta
 Pilar Muñoz as Sebas
 Eduardo Calvo as the major secretary
Julia Lorente as Visitación
Aurora Marquez as Alicia

Bibliography
Deveney, Thomas G: Cain on Screen: Contemporary Spanish Cinema, The Scarecrow Press, 1993,

Notes

External links

1974 films
Spanish drama films
1970s Spanish-language films
1974 drama films
Films directed by Jaime de Armiñán
Films with screenplays by Jaime de Armiñán
1970s Spanish films